Chris Fryar (born November 22, 1970) is an American drummer.  He is a member of  Zac Brown Band. He has also worked with Oteil and the Peacemakers, led by bassist Oteil Burbridge of the Allman Brothers Band, Charles Neville, Victor Wooten, John Popper, Steve Bailey, David Hood, Robert Moore and the Wildcats, and the blues trio, Gravy.

Fryar has a music degree. In the mid-1990s he had been underemployed in a Birmingham cover band, but then joined the blues-rock band Gravy. Singer-guitarist Rob Thorworth said that Fryar raised the group's musical sophistication.

In the 2000s, as part of Oteil and the Peacemakers, he was able to make use of both his jazz background and rock music sensibilities. He also became part of a later incarnation of the Zac Brown Band.

He divorced his prior wife and remarried on May 22, 2010, to Holly Travis, which gave Chris two step-children: Ashley and Allison.

Fryar endorses Grestch drums and Zildjian cymbals and states being extremely happy with his setup, but switches it around periodically.  His main setup consists of:

18" fx oriental china trash

14" K/Z hi-hat pair

18" K dark crash thin

20" A custom crash

20" fx oriental Crash of Doom

20" A custom ping ride

20" K Constantinople medium ride (used as both ride and crash)

References

External links
 http://www.chrisfryar.com
 http://www.oteilburbridge.com
 Official Zac Brown Band Website

American jazz percussionists
1970 births
Living people
American country drummers
Musicians from Birmingham, Alabama
Zac Brown Band members
20th-century American drummers
American male drummers
Jazz musicians from Alabama
21st-century American drummers
American male jazz musicians